Penitentiary Blues is the debut album of American singer David Allan Coe. It was released in 1970 on SSS International Records.

Style 

The lyrics of Penitentiary Blues are often dark and foreshadow the content of Coe's later country albums, discussing themes such as working for the first time, blood tests from veins used to inject heroin, prison time, hoodoo imagery and death.

AllMusic's Thom Jurek describes the album's style as "voodoo blues", writing "This is redneck music, pure and simple, fresh out of hell and trying to communicate the giddiness of reprieve as well as its horrors to the listener."

The album derives influence from Charlie Rich, Jerry Lee Lewis, Bo Diddley, Lightnin' Hopkins, and Tony Joe White.

Reception 

Allmusic's Thom Jurek wrote, "There are hints and traces of the lyrical genius Coe would display later, but taken as a whole, Penitentiary is thoroughly enjoyable as a rowdy, funky, and crude blues record full of out-of-tune guitars, slippery performances, and an attitude of 'fuck it, let's get it done and get it out,' which was a trademark of Plantation Records during the era."

Track listing
All Songs written by David Allan Coe except where noted.

"Penitentiary Blues" – 3:11
"Cell #33" (Coe, Teddy Paige) – 2:13
"Monkey David Wine" – 3:00
"Walkin' Bum" (Hank Mills) – 3:36
"One Way Ticket To Nowhere" (Coe, Betty Coe, Teddy Paige, Cliff Parker)  2:46
"Funeral Parlor Blues" (Coe, Betty Coe, Teddy Paige) – 3:12
"Death Row" – 2:44
"Oh Warden" (Coe, Teddy Paige) – 2:45
"Age 21" – 2:06
"Little David" – 2:12
"Conjer Man" – 2:09

Personnel
David Allan Coe – vocals
Teddy Paige, Jerry Kennedy, Mac Gayden – guitar
Teddy Paige, Charlie McCoy, Ed Kollis – harmonica
William C. Sanders, Billy Linneman, Mac Gayden, Charlie McCoy  – bass
Karl Himmel, Kenneth Buttrey – drums
David Briggs – piano
Teddy Paige, Shelby S. Singleton, Jr. – production
Joe Venneri - engineering
Gayle Allen - photography

References 

David Allan Coe albums
1970 debut albums
Blues albums by American artists